This page lists the awards won by players of the Miami Dolphins, a professional American football team who compete in the National Football League. The Dolphins' most recent award winner was Jason Taylor, who won the Defensive Player of the year and the Walter Payton Man of the Year awards in 2006 and 2007 respectively.

Individual League Awards

Associated Press NFL Most Valuable Player Award 

 1984: Dan Marino, QB

Associated Press NFL Offensive Player of the Year Award 

 1984: Dan Marino, QB

Associated Press NFL Defensive Player of the Year Award 

 1973: , S
 1983: , DE
 2006: , DE

Associated Press NFL Offensive Rookie of the Year Award 

 1987: Troy Stradford, RB

Associated Press NFL Defensive Rookie of the Year Award 

 1977: A. J. Duhe, DE
 1994: Tim Bowens, DT

Super Bowl Most Valuable Player Award 

 1973: , S
 1974: , RB

Associated Press NFL Coach of the Year Award 

 1972:

Walter Payton NFL Man of the Year Award 

 1985: Dwight Stephenson, C
 1998: , QB
 2007: , DE

NFLPA Alan Page Community Award 

 1986: Nat Moore, WR

References 

Miami Dolphins
American football team records and statistics